David Prinosil (born 9 March 1973) is a former tennis player from Germany, who turned professional in 1991.

Prinosil was born in Olomouc, Czechoslovakia, but later moved to Germany. He represented his country at the 1996 Summer Olympics in Atlanta, where he was defeated in the first round by Daniel Vacek of the Czech Republic. In the doubles competition in Stone Mountain Park he won the bronze medal partnering Marc-Kevin Goellner. He was the first opponent of Tim Henman in the main draw of a Grand Slam tournament, in the first round of Wimbledon in 1994.

The right-hander reached the fourth round of Wimbledon in 2000 and the quarterfinals of the Rome Masters in 1999 and the Paris Masters in 2000. Prinosil won three career titles in singles, and reached his highest singles ATP-ranking on 23 April 2001, when he became world No. 28. He began playing for Germany in the Davis Cup in 1996.

Prinosil achieved an upset victory over Greg Rusedski in the second round of the Ericsson Open Masters tournament in 2001 with strong returns. Rusedski had recently beaten Andre Agassi. Prinosil and Rusedski had gone through rehabilitation together after foot surgeries in the same hospital in 1999.

ATP career finals

Singles: 6 (3 titles, 3 runner-ups)

Doubles: 21 (10 titles, 11 runner-ups)

ATP Challenger and ITF Futures finals

Singles: 9 (5–4)

Doubles: 4 (4–0)

Performance timelines

Singles

Doubles

References

External links
 
 
 
 World ranking history
 A feat of strength by David Prinosil, Frankfurter Allgemeine, 27 June 2001

1973 births
Living people
German male tennis players
German people of Czech descent
Olympic bronze medalists for Germany
Olympic medalists in tennis
Olympic tennis players of Germany
Sportspeople from Olomouc
Tennis players at the 1996 Summer Olympics
Tennis players at the 2000 Summer Olympics
Medalists at the 1996 Summer Olympics